Martin "Marty" Calder (born January 25, 1967) is a Canadian wrestling coach for the Brock Badgers. He represented Canada in wrestling at the 1992 and 1996 Summer Olympics.

External links
Brock Badgers profile

1967 births
Sportspeople from St. Catharines
Brock Badgers wrestlers
Commonwealth Games gold medallists for Canada
Living people
Olympic wrestlers of Canada
Pan American Games bronze medalists for Canada
Wrestlers at the 1992 Summer Olympics
Wrestlers at the 1994 Commonwealth Games
Wrestlers at the 1996 Summer Olympics
Canadian male sport wrestlers
Wrestlers at the 1999 Pan American Games
Commonwealth Games medallists in wrestling
Pan American Games medalists in wrestling
Medalists at the 1999 Pan American Games
Medallists at the 1994 Commonwealth Games